On with the Show! is a 1929 American pre-Code musical film produced by Warner Bros. Filmed in two-color Technicolor, the film is noted as the first all-talking, all-color feature length film, and the second color film released by Warner Bros.; the first was the partly color, black-and-white musical The Desert Song (1929).

Plot
With unpaid actors and staff, the stage show Phantom Sweetheart seems doomed. To complicate matters, the box office takings have been robbed and the leading lady refuses to appear. The cast includes William Bakewell as the head usher eager to get his sweetheart, box-office girl Sally O'Neil, noticed as a leading girl. Betty Compson plays the temperamental star and Arthur Lake the whiny young male lead. Louise Fazenda is the company's eccentric comedian. Joe E. Brown plays the part of a mean comedian who constantly argues with Arthur Lake.

Cast

Songs
 "Welcome Home" Music by Harry Akst, Lyrics by Grant Clarke, Performed by Henry Fink and chorus, and Danced by The Four Covans
 "Let Me Have My Dreams" Music by Akst, Lyrics by Clarke, and Performed by Josephine Huston (on screen Betty Compson and later Sally O'Neil)
 "Am I Blue?" Music by Akst, Lyrics by Clarke, and Performed by Ethel Waters and the Harmony Four Quartette
 "Lift the Juleps to Your Two Lips" Music by Akst, Lyrics by Clarke, Sung by Henry Fink, Josephine Huston and chorus, and Danced by the Four Covans
 "In the Land of Let's Pretend" Music by Akst, Lyrics by Clarke, and Sung by Mildred Carroll and chorus
 "Don't It Mean a Thing to You?" Music by Akst, Lyrics by Clarke, Sung by Josephine Huston, and Danced by Marion Fairbanks and Madeline Fairbanks
 "Birmingham Bertha" Music by Akst, Lyrics by Clarke, Performed by Ethel Waters, with dancing by Angelus Babe.
 "Wedding Day" Music by Akst, Lyrics by Clarke, Sung by Henry Fink, Arthur Lake, Josephine Huston and chorus
 "Bridal Chorus" (uncredited) From "Lohengrin", Music by Richard Wagner, Played at the beginning of the finale

Production and promotion

Warner Bros. promoted On with the Show! as being in "natural color." The pioneers of sound were the first to introduce full talking combined with full color. Adverts proclaimed 'Now color takes to the screen'. For Warner's this would be the first in a series of contracted films made in color.

The film generated much interest in Hollywood and virtually overnight, most other major studios began films shot in the process. The film would be eclipsed by the far greater success of the second Technicolor film, Gold Diggers of Broadway. (Song of the West was actually completed first but had its release delayed until March 1930).

The film was a combination of a few genres. Part backstage musical using the now familiar 'show within a show' format, part mystery and part comedy. It featured famed singer Ethel Waters in two songs written and staged for the film. "Am I Blue?" and "Birmingham Bertha" (with dancer Angelus Babe).

Reception

Box Office
The film was a box office hit, with a worldwide gross of over $2 million.

According to Warner Bros records the film earned $1,741,000 domestically and $674,000 foreign.

Critical
Reviews from critics were mixed. Mordaunt Hall of The New York Times wrote that the film was "to be felicitated on the beauty of its pastel shades, which were obtained by the Technicolor process, but little praise can be accorded its story or to its raucous voices....It would have been better if this film had no story, and no sound, for it is like a clumsy person arrayed in Fifth Avenue finery." Variety reported that the film was "too long in running", but was nevertheless "impressive, both as an entertainment and as a talker." Film Daily called it "fine entertainment and a very adroit mixture of comedy, some rather bad pathos and musical comedy numbers." The New York Herald Tribune declared it "the best thing the films have done in the way of transferring Broadway music shows to the screen and, even if the story is bad and the entire picture considerably in need of cutting it is an admirable and frequently handsome bit of cinema exploring." John Mosher of The New Yorker wrote that the film was "completely undistinguished for wit, charm, or novelty, except that it is done in color. Possibly in the millennium all movies will be colored. In these early days of the art, however, not much can be said for it, except that it is not really distressing."

The film is recognized by American Film Institute in these lists:
 2004: AFI's 100 Years...100 Songs:	
 "Am I Blue?" – Nominated

Preservation
One reel of the 35mm color nitrate print of On With the Show exists at the BFI archive. Besides this reel, only black-and-white prints have survived from the rest of the film. A fragment of an original color print lasting about 20 seconds surfaced in 2005; other original color fragments have also been discovered in 2014. A copy of the b/w version has long been held by the Library of Congress.

Home media
In December 2009, On with the Show! (in Black-and-White) was made available on manufactured-on-demand DVD by the Warner Archive Collection.

See also
List of early color feature films
List of incomplete or partially lost films

References

External links

 (On with the Show! clip starts at 3:45)

1929 films
1929 musical films
1920s color films
American musical films
1920s English-language films
American films based on plays
Films directed by Alan Crosland
Warner Bros. films
Films with screenplays by Robert Lord (screenwriter)
Early color films
1920s American films